The 2004 Bausch & Lomb Championships was a women's tennis tournament played on outdoor clay courts at the Racquet Park at the Amelia Island Plantation in Amelia Island, Florida, United States. It was classified as a Tier II event on the 2004 WTA Tour. It was the 25th edition of the event and took place from April 5 to 11, 2004. Lindsay Davenport won the singles title.

Finals

Singles

 Lindsay Davenport defeated  Amélie Mauresmo, 6–4, 6–4

Doubles

 Nadia Petrova /  Meghann Shaughnessy defeated  Myriam Casanova /  Alicia Molik, 3–6, 6–2, 7–5

External links
 ITF tournament edition details
 WTA tournament edition details

Bausch and Lomb Championships
Amelia Island Championships
Bausch & Lomb Championships
Bausch & Lomb Championships
Bausch & Lomb Championships